East Main–Mechanic Streets Historic District is a national historic district located at Springville in Erie County, New York.  It is a  district encompassing 26 contributing structures, that primarily serve commercial functions.  A number of the structures are in the Italianate style.

It was listed on the National Register of Historic Places in 2002.

References

Historic districts in Erie County, New York
Italianate architecture in New York (state)
Buildings and structures in Erie County, New York
Historic districts on the National Register of Historic Places in New York (state)
National Register of Historic Places in Erie County, New York